Ectoedemia craspedota is a moth of the family Nepticulidae. It was described by Vári in 1963. It is known from South Africa (it was described from the Cape Province).

The larvae feed on Maytenus undata.

References

Endemic moths of South Africa
Nepticulidae
Moths of Africa
Moths described in 1963